The year 1754 in science and technology involved some significant events.

Astronomy
 Immanuel Kant, German philosopher, postulates retardation of Earth's orbit.

Chemistry
 Joseph Black, Scottish chemist, discovers carbonic acid gas.

Earth sciences
 Albert Brahms, Frisian Dijkgraaf, begins publication of Anfangsgründe der Deich und Wasser-Baukunst ("Principles of Dike and Aquatic Engineering") advocating scientific recording of tides.

Mathematics
 Joshua Kirby publishes the pamphlet Dr. Brook Taylor's Method of Perspective made Easy both in Theory and Practice containing William Hogarth's Satire on False Perspective.
 Lagrange begins to work on the problem of tautochrone.

Physics
 Václav Prokop Diviš, Czech theologian and natural scientist in the fields of applied electricity, develops a weather-machine. The same year, an electrical conductor devised by him is installed at the Vienna General Hospital.

Awards
 Copley Medal: William Lewis

Births
 March 4 – Benjamin Waterhouse, American physician (died 1846)
 March 15 – Archibald Menzies, Scottish surgeon and botanist (died 1842)
 May 6 – Thomas Coke, English agriculturalist and geneticist (died 1842)
 June 4 – Franz Xaver, Baron Von Zach, German astronomer (died 1832)
 August 21 – William Murdoch, Scottish engineer and inventor (died 1839)
 September 26 – Joseph Proust, French chemist (died 1826)

Deaths
 February 5 – Nicolaas Kruik (Cruquius), Dutch cartographer and meteorologist (born 1678)
 April 9 – Christian Wolff, German philosopher, mathematician and scientist (born 1679)
 April 15 – Jacopo Riccati, Italian mathematician (born 1676)
 November 27 – Abraham de Moivre, French mathematician (born 1667)

References

 
18th century in science
1750s in science